The Zhaori Hot Spring is a hot spring in Green Island, Taitung County, Taiwan.

History
During the Japanese rule of Taiwan, the hot spring was named Asahi Hot Spring.

Geology
The water spring is the only one of three saltwater hot springs in the world. The water source of the hot spring comes from the sea and underwater of the island heated by lava. The temperature of the hot spring ranges between 60 and 70°C.

Architecture
The hot spring consists of three open-air pools, a spa pool and five terrace-like pools.

See also
 List of tourist attractions in Taiwan
 Taiwanese hot springs

References

Hot springs of Taitung County